Gene stacking is the combination of more than one gene for plant disease resistance, or crop productivity, or other horticultural traits. In plant breeding traditionally that means breeding those genes in, but increasingly also can mean genetic engineering. This can be achieved a few different ways, and gene pyramiding is one of those methods. Stacking of transgenes is yet more difficult than stacking natural genes, but especially in the case of pest resistance genes which require a significant financial investment to insert, is advantageous over other methods. Pathosystems with rapid evolution in the pathogen have long been considered good targets of stacking, to broaden and prolong resistance.

Assaying for successful insertion of R genes is much more difficult than for one at a time. A simple challenge assay will only tell between complete failure/some unknown degree of success. Building a new technique specifically for the multiple genes you are attempting to insert may be necessary.

References

 

Plant diseases
Horticulture